Walla Walla is an unincorporated community in Cumberland County, Illinois, United States.

Namesake
It is named after Walla Walla, a city in Washington state, which in turn was named after a native American term meaning "Place of Many Waters".

Geography 
Walla Walla (GNIS FID: 423281) is a populated place located within the Township of Greenup, a minor civil division (MCD) of Cumberland County.
The elevation of Walla Walla is 587 feet. Walla Walla appears on the Greenup U.S. Geological Survey Map. Cumberland County is in the Central Time Zone (UTC -6 hours).

References

Unincorporated communities in Cumberland County, Illinois
Unincorporated communities in Illinois